Georgiou (Greek: Γεωργίου) is a Greek surname. Notable people with the name include:

 Alex Georgiou (born 1990), Australian athlete in Australia rules football
 Andreas Georgiou, Greek economist and former chief of Greece's national statistical agency
 Byron Georgiou (born 1950s), American lawyer and activist
 Chourmouzios Georgiou (c. 1770–1840), Greek composer and music teacher
 Costas Georgiou (1951–1976), British Cypriot mercenary
 Eleni Georgiou, Greek Olympic synchronized swimmer
 Elisa Georgiou (born 1994), Cypriot model
 Fotis Georgiou (born 1988), Greek footballer
 George Georgiou (disambiguation), several persons with the name
 Georgios Georgiou (disambiguation), several persons with the name, including Giorgos Georgiou
 John Georgiou (born 1975), Australian athlete in Australia rules football
 Kevin Georgiou (born 1985), British rapper known as "K-Koke"
 Lakis Georgiou (born 1938), Greek Olympic sports shooter
 Lenos Georgiou (born 1992), Cypriot footballer
 Marios Georgiou (gymnast) (born 1997), Cypriot gymnast
 Michael Georgiou (born 1988), English snooker player
 Nicolas Georgiou (born 1976), Cypriot footballer
 Panikos Georgiou (born 1954), Cypriot football club manager
 Petro Georgiou (born 1947), Greek-Australian politician
 Savva Georgiou (1933–1992), Cypriot footballer
 Stavros Georgiou (born 1972), Cypriot footballer
 Steven Georgiou (born 1948), British musician formerly known as "Cat Stevens", now Yusuf Islam.
 Vangelis Georgiou (born 1988), Greek footballer

See also
Georgi Kinkladze
Gheorghiu

References

Greek-language surnames
Surnames
Patronymic surnames
Surnames from given names